The 2009 Cyprus Women's Cup was the second edition of the Cyprus Women's Cup, an invitational women's football tournament held annually in Cyprus. The tournament was won by England.

Group stage

Group A

Group B

Knockout stage

Seventh place match

Fifth place match

Third place match

Final

Champion

References

2009
2009 in women's association football
2008–09 in Cypriot football